Holmquist   is a surname of Swedish origin (see Holmqvist). Holmquist may refer to:

Doug Holmquist (1941–1988), American minor league baseball player and manager
Ivar Holmquist (1879–1954), Swedish lieutenant general
John Holmquist, American television animation director
Joakim Holmquist (born 1969), Swedish Olympic freestyle swimmer
Jörgen Holmquist (1947–2014), Swedish economist, Director-General of Internal Market and Services at the European Commission
Ole Holmquist (born 1936), Swedish trombonist

See also
Holmquist, South Dakota

Surnames
Swedish-language surnames